Longchaeus insularum is a species of sea snail, a marine gastropod mollusk in the family Pyramidellidae, the pyrams and their allies.

Description

The shell has a yellowish color, banded and spotted with chestnut, with fine longitudinal white raised striations, appearing like low rounded riblets, with occasional darker macillations, especially on the base. The whorls of the teleoconch are flattened. The suture and periphery are channeled. The aperture is channeled at the base. The columella is straight, three plaited. The length of the shell is 15 mm.

Distribution
This species occurs in the Pacific Ocean off Hawaii.

References

 Sowerby, G. B., II. 1874. Descriptions of twelve new species of shells. Proceedings of the Zoological Society of London 1873:718–722, pl. 59

External links
 To World Register of Marine Species

Pyramidellidae
Gastropods described in 1922